Languria is a genus of lizard beetles in the family Erotylidae. There are about 18 described species in Languria.

Species
These 18 species belong to the genus Languria:

 Languria angustata (Palisot de Beauvois, 1805)
 Languria apicventris Casey
 Languria bicolor (Fabricius, 1798)
 Languria californica Fall, 1901
 Languria collaris LeConte, 1854
 Languria convexicollis Horn, 1868
 Languria denticulata Schaeffer, 1918
 Languria discoidea LeConte, 1854
 Languria erythrocephalus Blatchley, 1924
 Languria interstitialis Casey
 Languria irregularis Casey, 1916
 Languria laeta LeConte, 1854
 Languria marginipennis Schwarz, 1878
 Languria mozardi Latreille, 1807 (clover stem borer)
 Languria sanguinicollis Chevrolat, 1834
 Languria taedata LeConte, 1854
 Languria trifasciata Say, 1823
 Languria uhlerii Horn, 1862

References

Further reading

External links

 

Erotylidae
Articles created by Qbugbot